Derrel Gofourth (born March 20, 1955) was one of the most decorated offensive linemen in Oklahoma State University history in 1974-1976. He played in the National Football League (NFL) for the Green Bay Packers from 1977 to 1982 and appeared in 85 games before moving on to the San Diego Chargers from 1983 to 1984.

After retirement, he opened the Gofourth Agency and has sold insurance since 1990. In 2008 he was named as Oklahoma State's representative in the inaugural Big 12 Legends.

References

External links

1955 births
Living people
People from Parsons, Kansas
All-American college football players
American football offensive linemen
Oklahoma State Cowboys football players
Green Bay Packers players
San Diego Chargers players